The Apennine shrew (Sorex samniticus) is a species of shrew in the family Soricidae. It is endemic to Italy.

References

Sorex
Mammals of Europe
Endemic fauna of Italy
Mammals described in 1926
Taxonomy articles created by Polbot